15 Leonis Minoris is the Flamsteed designation for a single star in the northern circumpolar constellation of Ursa Major. It has an apparent visual magnitude of 5.08, making it a fifth magnitude star that is visible to the naked eye. Based on parallax measurements, it is located at a distance of 61.7 light years from the Sun. The star has been examined for an infrared excess, but none was detected.

This star has a stellar classification of G0 IV-V with an age of about 9.3 billion years, which suggests that it is an older G-type main sequence star that may be evolving into a subgiant as the hydrogen at its core runs out. The estimated mass of the star is 15% greater than the Sun's mass, and it is larger in girth than the Sun by +52%. It is spinning with a projected rotational velocity of 4 km/s. The star is radiating almost three times the luminosity of the Sun from its photosphere at an effective temperature of 5,859 K, giving it the yellow-hued glow of a G-type star.

References 

Ursa Major (constellation)
Leo Minoris, 15
G-type main-sequence stars
048113
3881
0368
084737
G-type subgiants
BD+46 1551